John Albeni de Alben et Medve (died March or May 1433) was a Hungarian prelate of German descent, who served as bishop of Pécs in the Kingdom of Hungary from 1410 to 1420 and as bishop of Zagreb in the Kingdom of Croatia within the Kingdom of Hungary from 1421 until his death.

References

  Koszta, László (2009). Albeni János (1410–1420). In: A Pécsi Egyházmegye története I: A középkor évszázadai (1009–1543) (Szerkesztette: Fedeles Tamás, Sarbak Gábor, Sümegi József) p. 118–120. ("A History of the Diocese of Pécs, Volume I: Medieval Centuries, 1009–1543; Edited by Tamás Fedeles, Gábor Sarbak and József Sümegi"); Fény Kft.; Pécs; . 
  ed. Romváry, Ferenc (2010). Pécs Lexikon  I. (A–M). Pécs Lexikon Kulturális Nonprofit Kft. 2010, Pécs.
  Markó, László: A magyar állam főméltóságai Szent Istvántól napjainkig – Életrajzi Lexikon p. 301. (The High Officers of the Hungarian State from Saint Stephen to the Present Days – A Biographical Encyclopedia) (2nd edition); Helikon Kiadó Kft., 2006, Budapest; .
  Hungarian Catholic Lexicon

14th-century births
1433 deaths
15th-century Roman Catholic bishops in Hungary
Hungarian Benedictines
Bishops of Pécs
John
Hungarian people of German descent